Rango is a 2011 action-adventure video game  developed by Behaviour Interactive and published by Electronic Arts and Paramount Digital Entertainment for the Nintendo DS, PlayStation 3, Wii, & Xbox 360. It is a video game sequel to the film of the same name.

Plot
One night 15 years before the events of the story, a meteorite crashes into a sand dune near the home of Beans, Rango's desert iguana girlfriend from the movie. The impact of the explosion scatters fragments everywhere. Beans' father walks up the hill and examines the crater, but he is taken in a flash of green light.

The story then flashes forward 15 years later, where we see Rango – the chameleon protagonist from the movie – awaken backwards on his roadrunner Excelsior riding into the town of Dirt. Rango walks into the saloon, but seconds later, Slim the turkey vulture walks in with a meteorite fragment in a fish can. Rango opens it, but this causes Slim to dematerialize in a flash of green light. As everyone marvels at what Rango has just done, he tells them about when his encounter with the rocks over the past 8 days.

The first day, Rango and his girlfriend Beans walk through Dirt, and Beans tells Rango about new evidence she has gathered about the abandonment of her father. Bad Bill the Gila monster attacks them, stealing Beans' saddle bag. Armed with a Popcorn Pistol (which he got from a swap meet) Rango chases Bill down to Skeleton Creek, where it is revealed that Bill has allied himself with the Jenkins Cousins, a portion of the Jenkins Brothers that everyone thought Rango had killed with one bullet in the movie.

Rango eventually tracks Bill down to the barber shop, where the Jenkins Gang has set up a hideout. After a firefight, sunlight is reflected off some sunglasses and lights Excelsior's tail on fire, causing him to run past a firework, lighting the fuse. The firework crashes into the barber shop, completely obliterating it and killing any remaining members of the Jenkins Gang. Bill and Rango both survive, and Bill is carried away by a bat; Rango recovers a meteorite fragment from the wreckage.

The next day, Spoons the Mouse alerts Rango that Bill is trying to hijack the water train. Rango rides on Excelsior and pursues Bill through the desert and catches up to the train, clambering onto it.

After multiple gunfights, Rango makes the halfway point of the train, but a gopher comes riding in on a bat with a machine gun attached to it, and opens fire on one of the cars, which contains dynamite sticks, causing the train cars to start rapidly burning down. Rango outruns the fire and makes it to the last few cars.

Rango eventually makes it to the coal box which contains cactus instead of coal, and where Bill is hiding, looking at a fish can. Rango corners Bill at gunpoint and retrieves the can, which contains another fragment, but Bill tosses a cluster of dynamite cartridges with the fuses already lit, and escapes on his bat. Rango notices Excelsior charging alongside the track, and jumps onto him as the train explodes.

The next day, Rango teams up with Beans, who is convinced that rocks play a part in her father's disappearance 15 years ago, and both of them track down Bill to the Forbidden Mine, a supposedly haunted mine hidden in Dry Creek. The townsfolk claim that the haunted mine is on a plain, while Rango claims that it is hidden in majestic cliffs. Rango chases Bill into the mine, but is chased by a boulder that destroys the entrance to the mine.

Beans later meets Rango at the entrance of Area 102 ("which is twice as mysterious as Area 51"), They also find a sign that says "Andromeda 5," and Beans is convinced that her father was in the area at some point. Bill runs into Andromeda 5, and Rango chases after him.

Rango eventually finds himself in Andromeda 5, a mostly abandoned and destroyed town. Bill makes it to the bell tower and opens fire on Rango with a machine gun. After multiple gunfights, Rango eventually golfs beetles at the bell tower, hitting the roof of the bell tower, the support beams holding the platform up, and the bell itself, which comes crashing down on top of Bill, trapping him, and revealing the third rock to be inside the machine gun. Rango retrieves the rock and he and Beans leave Andromeda 5.

Rango then tells everyone that the rocks are actually meteorite fragments.

The next evening, Rango looks for a different form of investigatory assistance, and travels to an RV, where a man named Lars lives. Lars is obsessed with finding aliens and performing scientific experiments on them.

Rango, realizing what Lars is, tries to escape being found by him, even going so far as to activate a radio, mariachi cuckoo clock, a singing fish mount, a television, and a camera to distract him.

He finds several newspaper articles posted on Lars' walls, including the meteorite crash in the desert 15 years ago, and theories about men from Mars. The very evidence he needed, Rango tries to escape, but is found by a crazed Lars. Rango golfs beetles at Lars' head, knocking him out. Rango escapes the trailer park with no rock.

The next day, Rango and Beans walk through Dirt, but Bill arrives, punches Rango into unconsciousness, and kidnaps both of them. It is revealed that Bill has teamed up with the Six-Toed Rodent Clan.

Rango wakes up in a multi-levelled maximum security prison, and realizes that his sidearm is missing. Rango escapes his cell by jumping out the window and climbing onto a lower level of the prison. He manages to retrieve his sidearm after the guard who held it gets crushed under a door by another guard whom Rango – upon retrieving the gun – kills.

Beans is loaded onto a stagecoach which Rango sees exit the prison. By sunrise, Rango has killed most of the Rodent Clan, and opened the exit doors. He mounts Excelsior and pursues the stagecoach throughout the desert. Eventually, he catches up with the stagecoach, but Bill mounts a machine gun on the top, firing at Rango. During the firefight, Rango manages to obliterate the stagecoach, sending Bill, Beans, and bits of the stagecoach flying in all directions. Beans falls, but Rango catches her. As she lands in his arms, a green rock lands on her dress: the 4th meteorite fragment.

At this point in the present, Beans has entered the saloon to see Rango. Rango continues the story.

The same day Rango rescued Beans, they make it back to town, but they hear a rattling sound near the cantina. The noise belongs to Rattlesnake Jake, the western diamondback rattlesnake from the first movie. Jake had heard Rango's lies about himself being Rango's "brother", and terrorized the town and its villagers. He was only stopped when Rango almost killed him at gunpoint and left the town. Later on, Jake found out about Rango's "little plan", claiming that should anyone claim possession of the rocks, he should be the one, not Rango, so he returns to Dirt to obtain the rest of the rocks and kill Rango in the process.

A fierce showdown takes place at town square, and it continues to the outskirts. Rango knocks out Jake, and as he hits to the ground, he ejects the 5th rock out of his mouth.

The next day, Rango believes Mr. Black the Southern black widow spider coffin-maker is using the rocks to power some "morally incorrect experiments". He enters Mr. Black's laboratory, and realizes what Mr. Black has been doing: taking corpses and genetically experimenting on them, eventually bringing them back to life, specifically the sheriffs. Rango – despite not being able to find Mr. Black – puts a stop to the experiments and takes the corpses back outside, only to find a massive horde of zombies invading the town, which has been set on fire, and the water tower has been emptied.

Too late to save the town, which has already been evacuated, Rango flees to the graveyard, where every corpse rises out of the graves. Rango protects the barrier of the graveyard from the rest of the town, and golfs explosive beetles at the zombies, killing every one of them. Bill flies by on a bat, but Rango – refusing to let Bill get away this time – calls on a bat of his own and pursues him.

Bill is distracted and doesn't look where he's going, and he ends up getting struck by a station wagon driven by Lars, and ends up getting stuck on the windshield. Rango, who had witnessed this, flies away satisfied.

While the townsfolk don't believe Rango's story of the zombie apocalypse, Rango finishes the story by talking about the events of the day before.

Rango heads out to the desert to think, and heads west towards what the townsfolk claim to be the blue hills, but what Rango claims to be the salt flats. With intense heat from the sun bearing down on him, Rango collapses.

Later, he reawakens next to an abandoned arcade machine, where multiple copies of his wind-up toy fish Mr. Timms float into. Rango eventually clambers onto the machine and accidentally steps on the activation button, which sucks him inside.

He finds himself inside an 8-bit 3D graphics world, where he navigates himself to Mr. Timms, who tells him "Beans holds the key." Rango rides Mr. Timms out of the arcade machine and back into the desert, where everything is now abnormal.

Rango dismounts Mr. Timms and walks towards a vision of himself in his old Hawaiian shirt he wore before he becoming the sheriff. The vision tells Rango, "You know what you have to do." Rango then blinks until the vision of himself isn't there, and then he passes out.

Rango reawakens backwards on Excelsior the next day, riding into Dirt.

As everyone ponders what the phrase means, Rango reveals that Beans had a key around her neck, and that her father scattered the rocks. Realizing that the final rock is in the bank, they use the key to open a safe deposit box where the rock is. That night, they gather all 8 rocks, which then transform into a floating orb that starts vaporizing everyone.

Mr. Black arrives and directs Rango and Beans to the clock tower, which is actually a rocket. They leave Earth's atmosphere and enter a large mothership near the planet. Emerging from the wreckage of the clock tower rocket, Beans runs off to find the others, with Rango following her. They open up a laser cell, revealing the cell's inhabitants to be Slim and Beans's father, revealed to be alive all along, but when Beans reveals that Rango reassembled the rocks, Beans's father is shocked because he thought nobody would find them in the places he hid the rocks, and that they should not have reassembled the rocks.

Rango finds the alien leader and defeats it by ejecting it from its weapon ball and crushing it under the heavy mass of the ball. Rango opens a separate spaceship so everyone can escape. Rango pilots the spaceship as the mothership is about to suck up Lars's trailer home. The spaceship ejects itself from the mothership just as Lars steps outside and shoots the mothership down with a shotgun.

Rango crashes the spaceship into the town square, and welcomes Beans' father back home.

Reception

Rango: The Video Game received "mixed or average reviews" on all platforms according to the review aggregation website Metacritic. While acknowledging its gameplay and other elements as commendable, the majority of critics noted the game's short play time and replay value as a major pitfall.

References

External links
 
 
 

2011 video games
Action-adventure games
Behaviour Interactive games
Nintendo DS games
Platform games
3D platform games
PlayStation 3 games
Video games about police officers
Video games about reptiles
Video games based on films
Video games developed in Canada
Video games scored by Lorne Balfe
Western (genre) video games
Wii games
Xbox 360 games
Single-player video games
Electronic Arts games